The Großer Sonnblick or Malteiner Sonnblick, a mountain with a height of , is a peak in the  Ankogel Group of the Hohe Tauern range in Austria. It is the easternmost peak of the Alps with a prominence over 100 metres and with a height exceeding .

Geography
The normal ascent route that is quite flat in the upper stages from the Gmünder Hut, is not difficult when conditions are dry and free of snow, but it is quite tiring to climb due to the large difference in height that has to be over come (some 1,900 metres). As there are no signposts or markings, good orientation is needed for this tour. In good weather there is an outstanding view from the top to the Großer Hafner and the Hochalmspitze.

Ascent  

The normal route takes about 5–6 hours from the Gmünder Hut initially along a forest track to the unmanaged Ochsen Hut, then over the footbridge of a stream (from here level) northwards across grassy slopes, steep in places to an alm bottom near the lake of Kleiner Melniksee. Next the route heads northwest through a blockfield up to a cirque south of the 'Middle Sonnblick, over a steep, scree slope into a col and finally in a southwesterly direction along the rocky summit ridge (sure-footedness needed) to the highest point.

Neighbouring peak 
East of the Großer Sonnblick lies the sub-peak of Mittlerer Sonnblick (3,000 m). The two summits are linked by a ridge that can be negotiated without the need for climbing.

References 

Mountains of Carinthia (state)
Mountains of the Alps
Ankogel Group